Nahiyeh may refer to:
 Nahiyeh, East Azerbaijan
 Nahiyeh, Mazandaran
 Nahiyeh, Qom